Bengaly Camara  was a Guinean teacher and politician. He served in the first council of the Politburo of the First Republic of Guinea as Minister of Labor and Social Affairs from 1957. He was also a Minister of Information and Tourism.

References

Guinean schoolteachers
Government ministers of Guinea
Possibly living people
Year of birth missing